Mississippi Highway 589 (MS 589) runs north–south from Interstate 59 (I-59) east of Purvis, Mississippi to U.S. Highway 49 (US 49) near Seminary, Mississippi. Portions of this highway run parallel to the Longleaf Trace.

History
MS 589 first appeared on maps in 1956, connecting from US 11 to US 49 and MS 590. Only a small section in Lamar County, and between US 98 and Sumrall were paved. More of the route in Lamar County was paved a year later. By 1958, a small part of MS 589 north of US 98 was rerouted west, connecting with the route south of US 98. All of the route south of Sumrall was paved by 1960. In 1967, MS 589 was extended to I-59, and the remaining unpaved section was removed from the map, until a year later.

Major intersections

References

External links

589
Transportation in Lamar County, Mississippi
Transportation in Covington County, Mississippi